The 1937 Kentucky Wildcats football team was an American football team that represented the University of Kentucky as a member of the Southeastern Conference (SEC) during the 1937 college football season. In their fourth season under head coach Chet A. Wynne, the Wildcats compiled an overall record of 4–6 record with a mark of 0–5 against conference opponents, finished in 12th place in the SEC, and were outscored by a total of 130 to 93. The team played its home games at McLean Stadium in Lexington, Kentucky.

Schedule

References

Kentucky
Kentucky Wildcats football seasons
Kentucky Wildcats football